is a Japanese manga series written and illustrated by Nekoguchi. It was serialized in Shogakukan's Shōnen Sunday S magazine from August to October 2015. It was then subsequently transferred to Weekly Shōnen Sunday, where it ran from December 2015 to September 2021. Its chapters were collected in twenty-eight tankōbon volumes.

Synopsis
Manabu Shindō is a teenager who works hard trying to apply for the University of Tokyo. However, his attempts to study are always hindered by his childhood friend Megumi Amano, who is always careless around him, giving Manabu some privileged views of her curvaceous body. As a result, this leads him to a series of comedic situations.

Characters

Manabu is a studious high student who is Megumi's childhood friend. His family owns a restaurant called Shindōken.

Megumi is a high school student who is Manabu's childhood friend. While she is in love with Manabu, she has not confessed this to him. She is a member of the kendo club.

Publication
Amano Megumi wa Sukidarake!, written and illustrated by Nekoguchi, was first serialized in Shogakukan's Shōnen Sunday S magazine from August 25 to October 24, 2015. It was then transferred to Shogakukan's Weekly Shōnen Sunday, where it was serialized from December 16, 2015, to September 1, 2021. Shogakukan collected its chapters in twenty-eight tankōbon volumes, released from March 18, 2016, to November 18, 2021.

Volume list

References

External links
Amano Megumi wa Sukidarake! official website at Web Sunday 

Romantic comedy anime and manga
School life in anime and manga
Shogakukan manga
Shōnen manga
Slice of life anime and manga